Walter Tyeson "Tye" Fields (born February 8, 1975) is an American former professional boxer who held the USBA heavyweight title.

Boxing career
Tye Fields grew up in Beaverton, Oregon. Fields played college basketball and was a starter at forward for San Diego State University. Fields never was an amateur. Standing at 6 feet and 8 inches and weighing around 275 lbs (125 kg), the southpaw Fields was considered large even for the heavyweight division.

In his professional career he has beaten some notable opponents such as Andy Sample, Saul Montana, Bruce Seldon, Sedreck Fields, Sherman Williams, Maurice Harris, Konstantin Airich, Raphael Butler and Michael Sprott. He started his career with a streak of 17 consecutive KO victories (16 of them coming in the first round) before he suffered his first loss to Jeff Ford via a 1st-round KO. He would later avenge this defeat by knocking out Ford in a rematch, also in the 1st round. In total Fields has 26 first-round knockouts among his 49 professional victories. He has won 4 regional titles.

On June 28, 2008, Fields faced off against Monte Barrett on the Manny Pacquiao – David Díaz undercard at the Mandalay Bay in Las Vegas. Fields suffered the second defeat of his career losing via knockout after just 57 seconds of the first round when Barrett (34–6, 20 KOs) delivered a series of accurate right hands, knocking Fields down and leaving him unable to beat the referee's count.

Following the defeat to Barrett Fields rebounded with 4 straight KO victories over lowly regarded opposition before taking another step up and challenging former heavyweight title challenger Michael Grant. The fight took place on March 11, 2011 at the Planet Hollywood Resort and Casino in Las Vegas. As with his previous step up in opposition Fields came up short when he was knocked out with a single punch from Grant in the third round.

Fields took part in the Prizefighter 'International heavyweights' tournament held at Alexandra Palace in London on 7 May 2011. After winning his opening 2 bouts against Michael Sprott and Konstantin Airich he matched up against the undefeated former Cuban amateur star Mike Pérez. Perez won the tournament and the £32,000 prize money when he knocked Fields out in the first round.

On October 7, 2011, Fields defeated a strong puncher Raphael Butler (35–10, 28 KOs) from Minnesota in the 6th round via technical knockout in 10-round main event on KO Boxing's Show of Force card at the Shaw Conference Centre in Edmonton, Alberta, Canada.

On March 24, 2012, Fields faced the WBC International titleholder, #8 WBC ranked undefeated Mariusz Wach (26–0, 14 KO) from Poland. The fight was set at the Resorts Hotel & Casino in Atlantic City, New Jersey and got coverage form ESPN's Friday Night Fights. Fields lost by TKO in the 6th round. After that loss Fields retired from boxing.

Professional boxing record

|-
| align="center" style="border-style: none none solid solid; background: #e3e3e3"|Result
| align="center" style="border-style: none none solid solid; background: #e3e3e3"|Record
| align="center" style="border-style: none none solid solid; background: #e3e3e3"|Opponent
| align="center" style="border-style: none none solid solid; background: #e3e3e3"|Type
| align="center" style="border-style: none none solid solid; background: #e3e3e3"|Round
| align="center" style="border-style: none none solid solid; background: #e3e3e3"|Date
| align="center" style="border-style: none none solid solid; background: #e3e3e3"|Location
| align="center" style="border-style: none none solid solid; background: #e3e3e3"|Notes
|-align=center
|Loss
|49–5
|align=left| Mariusz Wach
|TKO
|6 
|
|align=left| 
|align=left|
|-align=center
|Win
|49–4
|align=left| Raphael Butler
|TKO
|6 
|
|align=left| 
|align=left|
|-align=center
|Win
|48–4
|align=left| David Whittom
|RTD
|3 
|
|align=left| 
|align=left|
|-align=center
|Loss
|47–4
|align=left| Mike Perez
|TKO
|1 
|
|align=left| 
|align=left|
|-align=center
|Win
|47–3
|align=left| Konstantin Airich
|KO
|1 
|
|align=left| 
|align=left|
|-align=center
|Win
|46–3
|align=left| Michael Sprott
|SD
|3
|
|align=left| 
|align=left|
|-align=center
|Loss
|45–3
|align=left| Michael Grant
|KO
|3 
|
|align=left| 
|align=left|
|-align=center
|Win
|45–2
|align=left| Raymond Olubowale
|TKO
|3 
|
|align=left| 
|align=left|
|-align=center
|Win
|44–2
|align=left| Ken Frank
|TKO
|3 
|
|align=left| 
|align=left|
|-align=center
|Win
|43–2
|align=left| Galen Brown
|TKO
|3 
|
|align=left| 
|align=left|
|-align=center
|Win
|42–2
|align=left| Nicolai Firtha
|KO
|6 
|
|align=left| 
|align=left|
|-align=center
|Loss
|41–2
|align=left| Monte Barrett
|KO
|1 
|
|align=left| 
|align=left|
|-align=center
|Win
|41–1
|align=left| Roderick Willis
|TKO
|1 
|
|align=left| 
|align=left|
|-align=center
|Win
|40–1
|align=left| Chris Koval
|TKO
|1 
|
|align=left| 
|align=left|
|-align=center
|Win
|39–1
|align=left| Domonic Jenkins
|RTD
|7 
|
|align=left| 
|align=left|
|-align=center
|Win
|38–1
|align=left| Kendrick Releford
|UD
|10
|
|align=left| 
|align=left|
|-align=center
|Win
|37–1
|align=left| Maurice Harris
|RTD
|4 
|
|align=left| 
|align=left|
|-align=center
|Win
|36–1
|align=left| Ed Mahone
|TKO
|4 
|
|align=left| 
|align=left|
|-align=center
|Win
|35–1
|align=left| Bruce Seldon
|KO
|2 
|
|align=left| 
|align=left|
|-align=center
|Win
|34–1
|align=left| Saul Montana
|TKO
|3 
|
|align=left| 
|align=left|
|-align=center
|Win
|33–1
|align=left| Sedreck Fields
|UD
|8
|
|align=left| 
|align=left|
|-align=center
|Win
|32–1
|align=left| Ray Lunsford
|TKO
|2 
|
|align=left| 
|align=left|
|-align=center
|Win
|31–1
|align=left| Marcelo Aravena
|KO
|1 
|
|align=left| 
|align=left|
|-align=center
|Win
|30–1
|align=left| Julius Long
|KO
|3 
|
|align=left| 
|align=left|
|-align=center
|Win
|29–1
|align=left| Sherman Williams
|UD
|12
|
|align=left| 
|align=left|
|-align=center
|Win
|28–1
|align=left| Carlos Barcelete
|KO
|2 
|
|align=left| 
|align=left|
|-align=center
|Win
|27–1
|align=left| Brian Sargent
|TKO
|2 
|
|align=left| 
|align=left|
|-align=center
|Win
|26–1
|align=left| Marvin Hill
|TKO
|1 
|
|align=left| 
|align=left|
|-align=center
|Win
|25–1
|align=left| Francis Royal
|TKO
|3 
|
|align=left| 
|align=left|
|-align=center
|Win
|24–1
|align=left| Jose Flores
|TKO
|1 
|
|align=left| 
|align=left|
|-align=center
|Win
|23–1
|align=left| Joe Lenhart
|UD
|5
|
|align=left| 
|align=left|
|-align=center
|Win
|22–1
|align=left| Jeff Ford
|KO
|1 
|
|align=left| 
|align=left|
|-align=center
|Win
|21–1
|align=left| Ed White
|KO
|1 
|
|align=left| 
|align=left|
|-align=center
|Win
|20–1
|align=left| George Chamberlain
|TKO
|1 
|
|align=left| 
|align=left|
|-align=center
|Win
|19–1
|align=left| Undra Hawkins
|TKO
|1 
|
|align=left| 
|align=left|
|-align=center
|Win
|18–1
|align=left| Jason Nicholson
|TKO
|2 
|
|align=left| 
|align=left|
|-align=center
|Loss
|17–1
|align=left| Jeff Ford
|KO
|1 
|
|align=left| 
|align=left|
|-align=center
|Win
|17–0
|align=left| Andy Sample
|KO
|1 
|
|align=left| 
|align=left|
|-align=center
|Win
|16–0
|align=left| Nick Flores
|TKO
|1 
|
|align=left| 
|align=left|
|-align=center
|Win
|15–0
|align=left| Greg Suttington
|TKO
|2 
|
|align=left| 
|align=left|
|-align=center
|Win
|14–0
|align=left| Dan Kosmicki
|TKO
|1 
|
|align=left| 
|align=left|
|-align=center
|Win
|13–0
|align=left| George Chamberlain
|TKO
|1 
|
|align=left| 
|align=left|
|-align=center
|Win
|12–0
|align=left| Curtis McDorman
|KO
|1 
|
|align=left| 
|align=left|
|-align=center
|Win
|11–0
|align=left| Kevin Rosier
|TKO
|1 
|
|align=left| 
|align=left|
|-align=center
|Win
|10–0
|align=left| Travis Fulton
|KO
|1 
|
|align=left| 
|align=left|
|-align=center
|Win
|9–0
|align=left| Richard Davis
|KO
|1 
|
|align=left| 
|align=left|
|-align=center
|Win
|8–0
|align=left| Harold Johnson
|KO
|1 
|
|align=left| 
|align=left|
|-align=center
|Win
|7–0
|align=left| Brian McNeff
|TKO
|1 
|
|align=left| 
|align=left|
|-align=center
|Win
|6–0
|align=left| Chris McCarl
|KO
|1 
|
|align=left| 
|align=left|
|-align=center
|Win
|5–0
|align=left| Justin Wills
|KO
|1 
|
|align=left| 
|align=left|
|-align=center
|Win
|4–0
|align=left| Darryl Becker
|TKO
|1 
|
|align=left| 
|align=left|
|-align=center
|Win
|3–0
|align=left| Eric Graham
|KO
|1 
|
|align=left| 
|align=left|
|-align=center
|Win
|2–0
|align=left| Richard Slack
|TKO
|1 
|
|align=left| 
|align=left|
|-align=center
|Win
|1–0
|align=left| Gerald Hill
|TKO
|1 
|
|align=left| 
|align=left|
|-align=center

References

External links

It Came From Montana: The Odyssey of Tye Fields by Steven Shabo

Living people
1975 births
Boxers from Montana
Heavyweight boxers
Southpaw boxers
Basketball players from Montana
American men's basketball players
San Diego State Aztecs men's basketball players
Sportspeople from Missoula, Montana
Prizefighter contestants
Sportspeople from Beaverton, Oregon
American male boxers